The Coolangatta Gold: Original Soundtrack Recording is the licensed promotional soundtrack from the 1984 Australian film of The Coolangatta Gold. This CD release contains music by the composer Bill Conti.

Credits 
Engineer: Michael Stavrou 
Recording producer: Ashley Irwin 
Soundtrack album producer: Philip Powers 
Artwork: Alex Cotton and Bruce Bath 
Mastering: Meredith Brooks and Bruce Bath

Reception 
The soundtrack received good reviews from film music critics. It was recorded at the Sydney Town Hall by one of the largest orchestras ever assembled in Australia for a film soundtrack recording, largely comprising members (unofficially) of the Sydney Symphony Orchestra.

Jeff Hall raved about the score in Film Music Bulletin, "I was, in short, knocked out... If you love what the composer did for such films as the ROCKY series, THE RIGHT STUFF and ESCAPE TO VICTORY, you're going to lap this score up, as it's full of heroic and exciting music, led by the triumphant main theme... Unquestionably one of the film music releases of the year."

Andrew Keech was equally impressed in Music From the Movies. "The opening cue 'The Coolangatta Gold' is a glorious, stirring march that is an inspirational cross between the composer's fantastic theme for 'The Right Stuff' and Dvorak's 'New World'. This cue is full of pride and triumph, and is one of those cues that is an instant favourite… As the training intensifies and the film moves into the big race finale the music grows more like the big band, heavy beat music used in Rocky, increasing in power until breaking into the glorious orchestral 'Gold' theme once again for the 'Finale'. If that were not enough, most of the best cues receive a reprise, either in their LP versions or as alternative versions, in the eleven extra tracks included at the end of the album...... For fans of Bill Conti's work in the 1970s and 1980s this score is heaven, full of long exciting orchestral cues and dynamic big band exhilaration with every cue an absolute delight. A highly recommended score."

References

1984 albums
Sports film soundtracks
Bill Conti albums